Kerki is a city in and capital of Kerki District, Lebap Province, Turkmenistan. It was formerly known as Zamm and, between 1999 and 2017, as Atamyrat.

Geography 
It is situated on a plain on the left bank of the Amu Darya river. Nearby towns and villages include Mukry (3.3 nm), Amydarýa (2.1 nm), Surhy (3.1 nm) and Kerkichi (2.2 nm).

Etymology
According to Atanyyazow, the name Kerki is most likely of Persian origin, from ker ("fortress") and kuh ("mountain"), meaning "fortress on a mountain".  However, Muqaddasī and de Goeje assert it is a Turkified pronunciation of the Persian name Karkuh (کرکوه), meaning "deaf mountain". The ancient name, Zamm, is of obscure origin.

On 29 December 1999, by Parliamentary Resolution HM-60, the city and district of Kerki were renamed Atamyrat in honor of Atamyrat Nyýazow, father of Saparmurat Niyazov, who had worked in Kerki as a teacher before being killed in World War II. On 25 November 2017, by Parliamentary Resolution No. 679-V, Atamyrat was changed back to Kerki for both the city and the district.

Architecture 
The city centre comprises multiple single-storeyed brick buildings from the tsarist era.

Transportation

Air 
The town is served by the new Kerki Airport, which replaced a defunct municipal airport in 2021.

Road 
Kerki lies on the P-36 and P-39 highways, which both lead northwest to Turkmenabat, one on each side of the Amu Darya. Nearby junctions connect to the P-89, which leads north to the border with Uzbekistan at Tallymerjen, and the P-37, which leads southeast to the border with Uzbekistan at Kelif. In the opposite direction the P-36 also continues south to a junction with the Kerki-Ymamnazar ýoly, which in turn leads to the border with Afghanistan at Ymamnazar. In February 2013, a road bridge connecting the city with Kerkichi was commissioned; it replaced an old pontoon bridge.

Rail 
In 1999, the rail line from Türkmenabat to Kerki was finished, linking Kerki to the Turkmen railway network without having to detour into neighbouring Uzbekistan. In late 2016, a railway line was built south to Ymamnazar on the border with Afghanistan and further to Aqina, turning Kerki into a railway hub.

Sights
Astana Baba Mausoleum is managed by the Kerki city museum, and consists of a minaret and tomb built in the 11th century. Allamberdar Mausoleum is also part of the Kerki city museum. This 11th-century building represents Seljuk architecture of northern Khorasan.

See also 
List of cities, towns and villages in Turkmenistan
List of cities in Turkmenistan

References

External links
Satellite map at Maplandia.com

Populated places in Lebap Region